Duane R. Bushey (born May 3, 1944) is a retired senior sailor of the United States Navy who served as the seventh Master Chief Petty Officer of the Navy.

Early life
Following graduation from Wicomico High School in Salisbury, Maryland, Bushey enlisted in the United States Navy in June 1962.

Naval career
Bushey received recruit training at the Naval Training Center in Great Lakes, Illinois, and completed Aviation Electrician "A" school in Jacksonville, Florida. He first saw duty at the naval Air Test Facility at the Naval Air Station in Patuxent River, Maryland, followed by further technical training in an advanced electronics "B" school. He then served on board the aircraft carrier , with two follow-on tours as a flight instructor for fleet replacement navigators with Heavy Attack Squadron 123 at the Naval Air Station, Whidbey Island, Washington and Tactical Electronic Warfare Squadron 130 at the Naval Air Station in Alameda, California, where he served as Celestial and Radar Navigation Instructor.

Bushey then served as the Assistant Aircrew Division Officer for the Aircraft Ferry Squadron Thirty One in Norfolk, Virginia. While serving with VRF-31, he qualified as an overwater navigator in several aircraft, as flight engineer for P-3 Orion aircraft and bombardier/navigator for A-6 Intruder aircraft.

Bushey was selected to attend the United States Army Sergeants Major Academy in Fort Bliss, Texas in January 1980 and while there received the General Ralph E. Hanes Jr. Award for outstanding research. Following graduation in July 1980 he returned to VRF-31 as command master chief, deploying aboard . On September 9, 1988, Bushey became the seventh Master Chief Petty Officer of the Navy. He has accumulated more than 6,000 flying hours and made more than 400 carrier landings.

Awards and decorations

7 gold Service Stripes.

References

1944 births
Living people
Master Chief Petty Officers of the United States Navy
American navigators
Flight navigators
Recipients of the Meritorious Service Medal (United States)